Violations of Japanese airspace have occurred on a number of occasions. There have been 39 cases from 1967 to 2017. The vast majority have involved Soviet aircraft during the Cold War, or Russian aircraft afterwards.

There have been several prominent cases of airspace violations.

 Viktor Belenko MiG-25 defection (September 6, 1976)
 Soviet Tu-16 violation of airspace over Okinawa (December 9, 1987)

In addition to actual violations there are many cases of foreign aircraft skirting Japanese airspace or entering Japan's Air Defense Identification Zone. In 2016 fighter squadrons of the Japan Air Self-Defense Force (JASDF) aircraft launched 851 times to intercept Chinese aircraft and 301 times in response to Russian aircraft.

List of airspace violations

See also
 Tokyo Express (flights)

References

Aviation accidents and incidents in Japan
Japan Air Self-Defense Force